Patricia Edyth Smith (October 29, 1946 – April 14, 2017) was an American Republican politician who served in the Oregon House of Representatives from 2001 until 2009.

Smith was born to Albert and Beatrice Graff in Portland, Oregon. In 1964, she graduated from Corbett High School and later attended Mount Hood Community College.

Smith and her husband, Leroy, married on July 26, 1980. She had two children: Chad and Shannon, and three stepchildren: Melanie, Jeffrey and Valerie.

References

1946 births
2017 deaths
Republican Party members of the Oregon House of Representatives
Women state legislators in Oregon
Mt. Hood Community College alumni
Politicians from Portland, Oregon
21st-century American politicians
21st-century American women politicians